Frankincense (also known as olibanum) is an aromatic resin used in incense and perfumes, obtained from trees of the genus Boswellia in the family Burseraceae. The word is from Old French  ('high-quality incense'). There are several species of Boswellia that produce true frankincense: Boswellia sacra (syn. B. bhaw-dajiana, syn. B. carteri), B. frereana, B. serrata (B. thurifera, Indian frankincense), and B. papyrifera. Resin from each is available in various grades, which depends on the time of harvesting. The resin is hand-sorted for quality.

Etymology
The English word frankincense derives from the Old French expression , meaning 'high-quality incense'. The word  in Old French meant 'noble, pure'. Although named frankincense, the name does not refer to the Franks. This is postulated to be because they both derive from the word for 'white' and that the spice route went via Mount Lebanon.

Description

The trees start producing resin at about eight to 10 years old. Tapping is done two to three times per year with the final taps producing the best tears because of their higher aromatic terpene, sesquiterpene and diterpene content. Generally speaking, the more opaque resins are the best quality. Cheap resin is produced in the Horn of Africa, which is the Roman Catholic Church's major source.

The main species in trade are:
 Boswellia sacra: South Arabia.
 Boswellia bhaw-dajiana (older spelling Boswellia bhau-dajiana): Horn of Africa. It is a synonym of Boswellia sacra
 Boswellia carteri (older spelling Boswellia carterii): Horn of Africa, Nubia. It was long considered an independent species, but in the 1980s it was determined to be a synonym of Boswellia sacra.
 Boswellia serrata (synonym Boswellia thurifera, Indian frankincense): India.
 Boswellia papyrifera: Ethiopia, Eritrea, Sudan.
 Boswellia frereana: Horn of Africa. The resin is less bitter and the fragrance of incense is less "heavy" than Boswellia sacra. Contains no boswellic acids.

Other notable species:
 Boswellia occulta: Horn of Africa. In 2019, it was discovered that Somali harvesters considered Boswellia occulta to be the same species with Boswellia carteri even though their shapes are different, and sold resins from both species as the same thing. However, the chemical compositions of their essential oils are completely different.

Recent studies indicate that frankincense tree populations are declining, partly from overexploitation. Heavily tapped trees produce seeds that germinate at only 16% while seeds of trees that had not been tapped germinate at more than 80%. In addition, burning, grazing, and attacks by the longhorn beetle have reduced the tree population. Conversion (clearing) of frankincense woodlands to agriculture is also a major threat.

Chemical composition

These are some of the chemical compounds present in frankincense:
 acid resin (6%), soluble in alcohol and having the formula C20H32O4
 gum (similar to gum arabic) 30–36%
 3-acetyl-beta-boswellic acid (Boswellia sacra)
 alpha-boswellic acid (Boswellia sacra)
 incensole acetate, C21H34O3
 phellandrene
 olibanic acid

Among various plants in the genus Boswellia, only Boswellia sacra, Boswellia serrata and Boswellia papyrifera have been confirmed to contain significant amounts of boswellic acids.

History

Frankincense has been traded on the Arabian Peninsula for more than 5,000 years. Frankincense was also traded from the Horn of Africa during the Silk Road era. Greek historian Herodotus wrote in The History that frankincense was harvested from trees in southern Arabia. He reported that the gum was dangerous to harvest because of winged snakes that guard the trees and that the smoke from burning storax would drive the snakes away. Pliny the Elder also mentioned frankincense in his Naturalis Historia.

Frankincense was reintroduced to Western Europe by Frankish Crusaders, and other Western Europeans on their journeys to the Eastern Roman Empire where it was commonly used in church services. Although named frankincense, the name refers to the quality of incense brought to Western Europe, not to the Franks themselves.

Southern Arabia was an exporter of frankincense in antiquity, with some of it being traded as far as China.

Production

Thousands of tons of frankincense are traded every year to be used in religious ceremonies as incense in thuribles and by makers of perfumes, natural medicines, and essential oils. It can be inhaled or applied to the skin for its supposed health benefits. In the Horn of Africa, frankincense is harvested in the Bari and Sanaag regions: mountains lying at the northwest of Erigavo; El Afweyn District; Cal Madow mountain range, a westerly escarpment that runs parallel to the coast; Cal Miskeed, including Hantaara and Habeeno plateau and a middle segment of the frankincense-growing escarpment; Karkaar mountains or eastern escarpment, which lies at the eastern fringe of the frankinscence escarpment. In Dhofar, Oman, frankincense species grow north of Salalah and were traded in the ancient coastal city of Sumhuram, now Khor Rori.

Ecological status
In 1998, the International Union for Conservation of Nature warned that one of the primary frankincense species, Boswellia sacra, is "near threatened". Frankincense trees are not covered by the Convention on International Trade in Endangered Species of Wild Fauna and Flora, but experts argue that Boswellia species meet the criteria for protection. In a 2006 study, an ecologist at Wageningen University & Research claimed that, by the late-1990s, Boswellia papyrifera trees in Eritrea were becoming hard to find. In 2019, a new paper predicted a 50% reduction in Boswellia papyrifera within the next two decades. This species, found mainly in Ethiopia, Eritrea, and Sudan, accounts for about two-thirds of global frankincense production. The paper warns that all Boswellia species are threatened by habitat loss and overexploitation. Most Boswellia grow in harsh, arid regions beset by poverty and conflict. Harvesting and selling the tree's resin is one of the only sources of income for the inhabitants, resulting in overtapping.

Health benefits 
The use of Boswellia resin for spiritual and medicinal purposes dates back to ancient civilizations. Numerous compounds of different chemical categories are identified in the resin; the pharmacological actions of Boswellia resin are attributed to the complementary effects exerted by these compounds. Some clinical studies have weakly demonstrated the effectiveness of frankincense resin in some disease conditions like asthma, rheumatoid arthritis, inflammatory bowel diseases, osteoarthritis and relapsing-remitting multiple sclerosis, however more studies are necessary. The essential oil obtained from the oleogum resin of Boswellia serrata showed antimicrobial activities. Also, in vivo studies on animals revealed that frankincense oleogum resin exhibits neuroprotective activity.

Uses

The Egyptians cleansed body cavities in the mummification process with frankincense and natron. In Persian medicine, it is used for diabetes, gastritis and stomach ulcer. The oil is used in Abrahamic religions to cleanse a house or building of bad or evil energy—including used in exorcisms and to bless one's being (like the bakhoor commonly found in Persian Gulf cultures by spreading the fumes towards the body).

The incense offering occupied a prominent position in the sacrificial legislation of the ancient Hebrews. The Book of Exodus (30:34–38) prescribes frankincense, blended with equal amounts of three aromatic spices, to be ground and burnt in the sacred altar before the Ark of the Covenant in the wilderness Tabernacle, where it was meant to be a holy offering—not to be enjoyed for its fragrance. Scholars have identified frankincense as what the Book of Jeremiah (6:20) relates was imported from Sheba during the 6th century BC Babylonian captivity. Frankincense is mentioned in the New Testament as one of the three gifts (with gold and myrrh) that the magi "from the East" presented to the Christ Child.

In traditional Chinese medicine, frankincense along with myrrh are considered to have anti-bacterial properties and blood-moving uses. It can be used topically or orally, also used in surgical and internal medicine of traditional Chinese medicine. It is used to relieve pain, remove blood stasis, promote blood circulation and treat deafness, stroke, locked jaw, and abnormalities in women's menstruation.

Essential oil

The essential oil of frankincense is produced by steam distillation of the tree resin. The oil's chemical components are 75% monoterpenes, sesquiterpenes, and ketones. Contrary to some commercial claims, steam distilled frankincense oils do not contain the insufficiently volatile boswellic acids (triterpenoids), although they may be present in solvent extractions. The chemistry of the essential oil is mainly monoterpenes and sesquiterpenes, such as alpha-pinene, Limonene, alpha-Thujene, and beta-Pinene with small amounts of diterpenoid components being the upper limit in terms of molecular weight.

Essential oils can be diluted and applied to skin or the frangrance can be inhaled.

See also 
 Trade
 Land of Frankincense (Frankincense Trail), site in Oman
 Incense trade route, a large network around the Mediterranean and beyond
 Nabataeans, a trader tribe
 Literature
 Desi Sangye Gyatso, author of a tibetan herbal
 Historia Plantarum (Theophrastus book)
 Similar plants and products
 Elemi, resin or tree
 Myrrh, resin
 Palo santo (Bursera graveolens), tree
 Agarwood
 Benzoin (resin)
 Copal

References

Further reading

External links 

 
 

 
Incense material
Resins
Plant products